
Viaducto may refer to:

Argentina
Estadio Julio Humberto Grondona, or the Estadio Viaducto, a multi-use stadium in Buenos Aires

Chile
Malleco Viaduct (Viaducto del Malleco) is a railway bridge located in central Chile

Mexico
Viaducto Miguel Alemán, a freeway in Mexico City
Viaducto metro station, a metro station in Mexico City
Viaducto (Mexico City Metrobús), a BRT station in Mexico City
Puente de la Unidad or Viaducto de la Unidad, a cable-stayed bridge that connects the cities of Monterrey and San Pedro Garza García in the state of Nuevo León

Spain
Viaducto de Montabliz, a bridge located in the town of Montabliz, Cantabria